Deputy Commander Capability is responsible for the strategic planning and delivery of all aspects of Royal Air Force capability, including people, equipment, infrastructure, and training. The appointee is a Member of the United Kingdom's Air Force Board as the Air Member for Personnel and Capability due to their position. The current Deputy Commander Capability is Air Marshal Sir Richard Knighton.

Previous post-holders
This appointment is held concurrently with the Air Member for Personnel.

Deputy Commanders-in-Chief (Capability)
Air Marshal Stephen Dalton CB, 1 May 2007 to 31 March 2009
Air Marshal Simon Bryant CBE, 1 April 2009 to 17 June 2010
Air Marshal Andrew Pulford CBE, 1 September 2010 to 2012

Deputy Commanders (Capability)
Air Marshal Sir Andrew Pulford KCB, CBE, 2012 to 3 May 2013
Air Marshal Sir Barry North KCB OBE, 3 May 2013 to May 2016
Air Marshal Sean Reynolds CBE DFC, May 2016 to August 2018
Air Marshal Michael Wigston CBE, August 2018 to May 2019
Air Marshal Andrew Turner CB CBE, May 2019 to April 2022
 Air Marshal Sir Richard Knighton KCB, May 2022 to present

See also
Deputy Commander Operations

References

Royal Air Force appointments